Christian Freiherr von Stetten (born 24 July 1970 in Stuttgart) is a Swiss-German businessman and politician of the Christian Democratic Union of Germany (CDU). He has served as Member of the Parliament of Germany, the Bundestag, since 2002. He represents the constituency of Schwäbisch Hall-Hohenlohe, and succeeded his father Wolfgang von Stetten as the Member of Parliament from that constituency.

Early life and career
Von Stetten was born to a Swiss mother and a German father. After finishing high school and carrying out his military service, he studied Business Administration at the University of Mannheim and the Heilbronn University of the Applied Sciences and graduated with a master of business administration degree. In 1996, while still a university student, he founded his first business in the town of Künzelsau, Germany. The establishment of other companies followed later.

Political career

Von Stetten was elected to the Bundestag, the federal German parliament, in the 2002 elections as the representative of the district of Schwaebisch Hall–Hohenlohe. He was re-elected in 2005, 2009, and 2013.

Von Stetten is a member of the Christian Democratic Union, one of the parties in the present grand coalition government led by Chancellor Angela Merkel. In parliament, he has been particularly active as a financial expert. He has been a member of the Finance Committee since 2002. In this capacity, he is his parliamentary group's rapporteur on the inheritance tax. In addition, he served on the Committee for the Scrutiny of Elections, Immunity and the Rules of Procedure between 2005 and 2013.

Within his CDU/CSU parliamentary group, von Stetten serves as deputy chairman of the Group of Small and Medium-Sized Businesses (PKM).

In the negotiations to form a Grand Coalition of the Christian Democrats and the Social Democrats (SPD) following the 2013 federal elections, von Stetten was part of the CDU/CSU delegation in the working group on financial policy and the national budget, led by Wolfgang Schäuble and Olaf Scholz.

Political positions
In light of the Greek government-debt crisis, Stetten stated in early 2012 that "a Greek exit from the euro zone would not be the end of the world." On February 27, 2015, he voted against the Merkel government’s proposal for a four-month extension of Greece's bailout; in doing so, he joined a record number of 29 rebels from the CDU/CSU parliamentary group who expressed skepticism about whether the Greek government under Prime Minister Alexis Tsipras could be trusted to deliver on its reform pledges. On July 17, he voted against the government’s proposal to negotiate  yet another bailout for Greece. Ahead of the final vote on Greece's third bailout plan in August 2015, Stetten stated that "a temporary Grexit remains the right solution."

Ahead of the Christian Democrats’ leadership election in 2018, von Stetten publicly endorsed Friedrich Merz to succeed Angela Merkel as the party's chair.

Other activities
 Honorary Consul of the Maldives
 Association of German Foundations, Member of the Parliamentary Advisory Board
 Friedrich Kriwan Foundation, Member of the Board of Trustees
 Allianz Global Investors Deutschland, Member of the supervisory board (2009-2010)

Personal life
 
Stetten is a member of the noble Franconian Stetten family (de), who date back to 1098. His mother is Swiss, and he holds dual German and Swiss citizenship. He has a brother, Richard (born 1971), and a sister, Franziska (born 1977).

References

External links 
 Website of Christian von Stetten

1970 births
Living people
Members of the Bundestag for Baden-Württemberg
Businesspeople from Stuttgart
German people of Swiss descent
Members of the Bundestag 2021–2025
Members of the Bundestag 2017–2021
Members of the Bundestag 2013–2017
Members of the Bundestag 2009–2013
Members of the Bundestag 2005–2009
Members of the Bundestag 2002–2005
Politicians from Stuttgart
Members of the Bundestag for the Christian Democratic Union of Germany